Karl or Carl Gottlob Zumpt (20 March 179226 June 1849) was a German classical scholar known for his work in the field of Latin philology.

Life
Karl Gottlob Zumpt was born at Berlin on 20 March 1792.

Educated at Heidelberg and Berlin, he was from 1812 onward, a schoolteacher at Friedrich Werder Gymnasium in Berlin. In 1821 he transferred as a professor to the Joachimsthal Gymnasium, also in Berlin. In 1827 he was appointed professor of classical philology at the University of Berlin.

His chief work was his "Latin Grammar" ("Lateinische Grammatik"", 1818), which stood as a standard work until superseded by Johan Nicolai Madvig's textbook in 1844 (In Danish: "Latinsk Sproglære til Skolebrug"). He edited Quintilian's "Institutio Oratoria" (Volume 5, 1829, a project started by Georg Ludwig Spalding), as well as works by Quintus Curtius Rufus and Cicero:
 "Q. Curtii Rufi De gestis Alexandri Magni, regis Macedonum, libri qui supersunt octo by Quintus Curtius Rufus", 1826.
 "M. Tullii Ciceronis Verrinarum libri septem", 1830.
 "M. Tullii Ciceronis de officiis libri tres. Ad optimorum exemplarium sidem recensiti", 1837.

Otherwise, he primarily devoted his time and efforts to Roman history, publishing "Annales veterum regnorum et populorum" (3rd ed. 1862), a work in chronology down to 476 AD, and other antiquarian studies.

He was the uncle of August Wilhelm Zumpt.

References

External links
 
 
 Life and works by A. W. Zumpt 
 A list of works (51 entries): 
 List of works Berlin, 2002

1792 births
1849 deaths
German classical scholars
German philologists
Members of the Prussian Academy of Sciences
Writers from Berlin
People from the Margraviate of Brandenburg
Heidelberg University alumni
Humboldt University of Berlin alumni
Academic staff of the Humboldt University of Berlin
German male writers